Lampropteryx is a genus of moths in the family Geometridae described by Stephens in 1831.

Species
Lampropteryx albigirata (Kollar, 1848)
Lampropteryx argentilineata (Leech, 1897)
Lampropteryx chalybearia (Moore, 1868)
Lampropteryx jameza (Butler, 1878)
Lampropteryx minna (Butler, 1881)
Lampropteryx nishizawai Sato, 1990
Lampropteryx otregiata (Metcalfe, 1917) – Devon carpet
Lampropteryx suffumata (Denis & Schiffermüller, 1775) – water carpet
Lampropteryx synthetica Prout, 1922

References

Cidariini
Taxa named by James Francis Stephens